Owli-ye Shomali (also Romanized as Owlī-ye Shomālī; also known as Olī-ye Shomālī) is a village in Owli Rural District of the Central District of Deyr County, Bushehr province, Iran. At the 2006 census, its population was 498 in 109 households. The following census in 2011 counted 679 people in 177 households. The latest census in 2016 showed a population of 1,269 people in 220 households; it was the largest village in its rural district.

References 

Populated places in Deyr County